Cephalcia is a genus of insects belonging to the family Pamphiliidae.

The genus was first described by Panzer in 1803.

The species of this genus are found in Europe and Northern America.

Species:
 Cephalcia abietis
 Cephalcia alashanica
 Cephalcia alpina
 Cephalcia arvensis
 Cephalcia pallidula

References

Sawflies
Sawfly genera